In electromagnetism, a magnetic form factor is the Fourier transform of an electric charge distribution in space.

See also
For the form factor relevant to magnetic diffraction of free neutrons by unpaired outer electrons of an atom see also: atomic form factor

External links 
Magnetic form factors, Andrey Zheludev, HFIR Center for Neutron Scattering, Oak Ridge National Laboratory
"The magnetic form factor of the neutron", E.E.W. Bruins, November 1996

Electromagnetism